Follis, a term used in the Ancient Rome, or Ball of Wind (pilota de vent), a term used in the 15th and 16th centuries in Spain and Italy, was a hollow ball, inflated with air under pressure, which allowed the ball to jump and bounce when impacting at a certain speed with any solid body. The different types of balls of wind were commonly used to play a variety of ball games that were popular on that particular period of time.

Today, although many of the existing balls are inflated with air, the modern name is simplified to "ball," regardless of the system.

History 

There are studies that deal with this issue in some depth, citing numerous documents from famous authors (Alfonso X of Castile who banned the "juego de pelota" with imprisonment, Desiderius Erasmus, Rabelais, Calderon de la Barca, Baltasar de Castiglione, and Antonio da Salò Scaino).

The ancient Greeks played ball but it is not documented that they used inflated balls but it seems likely.
At time of the Roman Empire had balls wind, with the larger balls called "follis" and the smaller balls called "follicis." The air chamber was made of animal bladders, preferably that of a pig.

When mentioning the Mesoamerican Ballgame (specifically Mexican) chroniclers used to compare the different consistency of the indigenous caoutchouc solid balls with the European air-filled balls. 

One of the most important testimonies as regarding to the details, is the one by Luis Vives (1493-1540). Vives wrote a comparison between the Jeu de Paume (played with hard balls and rackets with gut stringing -although it means "played with the palm") and the Spanish ball game (similar to the actual pilota valenciana and played with "balls of wind" struck with the palm of the hand).

In his testimony, Joan Lluís Vives explains the Jeu de Paume comparing the strings of the racquet from that game played in Paris, with animal gut used for the sixth string of a guitar. The demands of a tennis racket stringing being similar make strings of animal intestine well suited for this use as well.

According to a book of 1840, Barcelona had a place for playing a "joc de pilota," but it is not clear what kind of game or games were played in that place.

The arrival and discovery of rubber and synthetic polymers allowed an improvement in the performance of many games and sports balls.

Scaino Antonio and his work on the ball game 
At the request of  Alfonso d'Este, Antonio da Salò Scaino (priest, theologian and writer) documented the ball game.
With reference balls of wind, he described in detail how the bladder and the small tube and a kind of Check valve (or retention) based packing, allowing the bellows to properly inflate the ball in a similar way of the one being used today. He also mentioned the habit of adding some wine inside the chamber so the balls could keep its characteristics (its flexibility) over the time.
The system of "Check valve" employed in the balls of wind made of bladder, was described by Juan Valverde de Amusco and "Fray Luis de Granada."

Construction 
The usual ball of wind was the bladder of an animal. Its outer surface was coated with leather and, once covered, the bladder was filled with air under pressure, using a dedicated type of bellows to inflate it.

See also 
Palazzo della Pilotta
Ball game
Ball
Augurio Perera

References

External links 
  International Tennis Federation  (in English)

Balls